To Each His Own may refer to:

Suum cuique, a Latin expression meaning to each his own
To Each His Own (novel), a 1966 novel by Leonardo Sciascia
To Each His Own (1946 film), an American drama film starring Olivia de Havilland
To Each His Own (2017 film), a Japanese film starring Sota Fukushi
To Each His Own Cinema, a 2007 film
"To Each His Own" (Jay Livingston and Ray Evans song), 1946
"To Each His Own" (Faith, Hope & Charity song), 1975
 To Each His Own (album), a 1968 album by Frankie Laine

See also
Jedem das Seine, a German translation of the Latin suum cuique, meaning to each his own
To Each, Her Own, a 2018 French film directed by Myriam Aziza